Omorgus texanus is a beetle of the family Trogidae.

Gallery

References 

texanus
Beetles described in 1854